John Hart (died 1574) was an English educator, grammarian, spelling reformer and officer of arms. He is best known for proposing a reformed spelling system for English, which has been described as "the first truly phonological scheme" in the history of early English spelling. As an officer of arms, John Hart held the title of Chester Herald between 1566 and 1574.

Spelling reform 
Hart is the author of three known works on grammar and spelling: an unpublished manuscript from 1551 titled The Opening of the Unreasonable Writing of Our Inglish Toung; a printed pamphlet titled An Orthographie, published in 1569; and a practical reading primer titled A Methode or Comfortable Beginning for All Unlearned, published in 1570. In these works, he criticises the contemporary spelling practices of his day as chaotic and illogical, and argues for a radically reformed orthography on purely phonological principles. His goal was to introduce a spelling system with a one-to-one relationship between sounds and symbols ("to vse as many letters in our writing, as we doe voyces or breathes in speaking, and no more "). For this purpose, he introduced six new phonetic consonant symbols for the sounds  and syllabic l, as well as a system of diacritics for vowels. Long vowels were systematically marked by a dot below the letter, while the reduced vowel schwa was marked by ë.

Historical relevance 
Hart's work has been lauded by modern linguists for his highly insightful phonetic analysis of the Early Modern English of his days, and for his thoroughness in pursuing the phonetic principle. His discussion of vowel pronunciations is particularly interesting to historians of the English language, because it documents the spoken English at an intermediate point during the Great Vowel Shift, which during Hart's days was radically transforming the vowel system of English.

Example 
The following passage from Hart's Orthographie, in his original spelling, illustrates the system. (For technical reasons, Hart's six new consonant symbols have here been replaced by their equivalent modern IPA symbols.)

References

English officers of arms
Orthographers
English-language spelling reform advocates
Linguists of English
Year of birth missing
1574 deaths
16th-century English educators
16th-century English writers
16th-century male writers
English male writers